Edward Charles Babb (February 1, 1834 – March 9, 1899) was an American Civil War veteran and businessman who served as the 15th mayor of Minneapolis.

Life and career
Babb was born in Westbrook, Maine. After attending local schools and briefly working as a teacher and marble cutter he became involved in the lumber industry. In the American Civil War he served with the 9th New Hampshire Volunteer Infantry, serving in many important engagements and being promoted from private to captain over the course of the war. In 1868 he moved to Minneapolis, initially working in the lumber industry and later as president of the Cedar Lake Ice Company. In 1888 he was elected mayor of Minneapolis as a Republican, serving one term from 1889 to 1891. Babb died in Minneapolis in 1899. He is buried in Lakewood Cemetery in Minneapolis.

Electoral history
Minneapolis Mayoral Election, 1888
Edward Charles Babb 17,882
Philip Bickerton Winston 14,759		
William J. Dean 1,365		
Baldwin Brown 2		
Hugh Galbraith Harrison 1
Write-Ins and Scattering 1

References

1834 births
1899 deaths
Mayors of Minneapolis
Politicians from Westbrook, Maine
People of New Hampshire in the American Civil War
Businesspeople from Minnesota
19th-century American politicians
19th-century American businesspeople
Minnesota Republicans